Lovrečica or San Lorenzo is a village in Croatia. It is part of Umag.

The Miro Sailing and Windsurfing Academy offers courses on dinghies, sailboats, windsurf, kayak and SUP for all ages and all levels.

References

External links
Lovrečica on City of Umag homepage

Populated places in Istria County